Bhopalgarh is a town located in the Jodhpur District of Rajasthan state in western India. It is a panchayat village and headquarters of the Bhopalgarh tehsil. Bhopalgarh Fort is the centre of attraction in the town. It is located in the Thar Desert, 90 km by road northeast of the city of Jodhpur, and 76 km by road west of Merta City in Nagaur District.
Some of the villages which come under Bhopalgarh town are Kumbhara, Bhagoriya, Kuri, Tambariya and Heradeshar.

Demographics
In the 2001 India census, the town of Bhopalgarh had a population of 19,078. Males constituted 9,907 (51.9%) of the population and females 9,171 (48.1%), for a gender ratio of 926 females per thousand males.

References

Cities and towns in Jodhpur district
Jodhpur district